Whitestone is a municipality in the Canadian province of Ontario, as well as the name of a community within the municipality.

The municipality, located in the Parry Sound District, had a population of 916 in the Canada 2016 Census.

History

In 2000, the Municipality of Whitestone was formed out of Unorganized Centre Parry Sound District and incorporated by the Parry Sound District Restructuring Commission. The new municipality includes the geographic townships of East Burpee, Burton, McKenzie, Ferrie, Hagerman, and part of Croft, as well as the communities of Ardbeg, Dunchurch, Maple Island, and the village of Whitestone.

A popular attraction was once the Ardbeg fire tower, which was one of the last remaining staffed towers in Southern Ontario until the early 1970s when aerial forest fire detection took over. It stood on a small hill where the road meets the railway.

Communities
The municipality comprises the communities of Ardbeg, Boakview, Bolger, Burton, Dunchurch, Fairholme, Lorimer Lake, Maple Island, South Magnetawan, Sunny Slope, Wahwashkesh, and Whitestone.

Geography
The municipality's vegetation is dominated by white pine trees, and the area is dotted with many lakes, including Wahwashkesh Lake, Shawanaga Lake, Whitestone Lake, Wilson Lake and Lorimer Lake. The three major rivers are Magnetawan River, Shawanaga River, and Naiscoot River, all flowing west into Georgian Bay.

Demographics

Mother tongue:
 English as first language: 88.4%
 French as first language: 2.9%
 English and French as first language: 0%
 Other as first language: 8.7%

See also
List of townships in Ontario

References

External links

Municipalities in Parry Sound District
Single-tier municipalities in Ontario